Coccoloba tuerckheimii is a plant species in the genus Coccoloba. The species can be found in Guatemala, Honduras, Nicaragua, Costa Rica, and Panama.

References

tuerckheimii